This list of fictional frogs and toads in animation is subsidiary to the list of fictional animals. It is restricted solely to notable frog and toad characters from notable animated works. Characters that appear several separate works will be recorded here only once.

List

See also
 List of fictional frogs and toads

References

Fictional frogs and toads

Frogs and toads in animation
Frogs and toads